The Vue at Lake Eola is a residential skyscraper in Downtown Orlando. It is the third tallest building in the city, being only two feet shorter than Hyatt Regency Orlando and  shorter than 200 South Orange. It houses 34 floors of condos and has penthouses on its top level. The penthouses have access to the balcony on the 36th floor roof of the building.

Details
When The Vue opened most of the 375 units had already been sold. The prices for the units ranged from US$500,000 to US$3 million for the top Penthouse units, as they had been purchased before the United States housing bubble burst.

The sides and "crown" of the building light up at night with blue lights. During December the side lights have a light show with red and green Christmas colors.

See also
Downtown Orlando
Orlando, Florida
List of tallest buildings in Orlando

References

External links 
 VUEOrlando.com

Residential skyscrapers in Florida
Skyscrapers in Orlando, Florida
Residential condominiums in the United States
2008 establishments in Florida
Residential buildings completed in 2008